Marta y Javier is a Venezuelan telenovela produced and aired by Radio Caracas Televisión in 1983. It is based on the radionovela Siempre te he querido written by Delia Fiallo with this free version adapted by Ligia Lezama. The telenovela ran for 64 episodes and was distributed internationally by Coral International.

Mayra Alejandra and Carlos Olivier starred as the main protagonists with Tatiana Capote as the main antagonist.

Synopsis 
Javier, a medical student, falls in love with Marta, the hospital director's daughter, and in his eagerness to woo her, they suffer an accident in which Marta is left blind. But she must face yet another tragedy: the death of her father. These sudden blows fill her with bitterness and, blaming Javier, she refuses to accept that she is in love with him. The young doctor, filled with guilt, goes abroad to specialize in eye surgery and upon his return, he successfully operates on Marta, who does not know who her surgeon is.

Cast
Mayra Alejandra as Marta
Carlos Olivier as Javier
Tatiana Capote as Julia
Javier Vidal as Ernesto
Esther Orjuela as Celia
Tomаs Henriquez as Julio Bermudez
Nury Flores as Paulina
Amalia Perez Diaz as Eleonora
Charles Barry as Luis Camillo
Hazel Leal as Maria Antonieta
Rosario Prieto as Lucia
Rodolfo Drago as Guillermo Ortiz
Patricia Noguera

References

External links
Marta y Javier at the Internet Movie Database

1983 telenovelas
RCTV telenovelas
Venezuelan telenovelas
1983 Venezuelan television series debuts
1983 Venezuelan television series endings
Spanish-language telenovelas
Television shows set in Venezuela